Brickellia laccata  is a Mexican species of flowering plant in the family Asteraceae. It is native to the state of Coahuila in northern Mexico.

Brickellia laccata is a small, cliff-dwelling shrub up to 25 cm (10 inches) tall. Flower heads are on the ends of short branches, usually one at a time but sometimes 2 or 3. Flowers are straw-colored with darker tips.

References 

laccata
Flora of Coahuila
Plants described in 1834